Miguel Martínez Domínguez (September 29, 1921 in Celaya, Guanajuato – December 6, 2014 in Mexico City) was a Mexican musician, composer and arranger of mariachi, pioneer in the use of trumpet in this genre.

Biography 

From the middle of the 1930s until 1940s, worked in the Plaza Garibaldi like musician in poor conditions, doing occasional substitutions with the mariachi of Concho Andrade that interpreted his pieces in the legendary bar Tenampa. Martínez worked in the Mariachi Vargas of Tecalitlán from 1942 until roughly 1965, with some absences. In this group Martínez defined the function of the trumpet in the mariachi, instrument that was not usual in this gender until him. During practically all his participation in the Mariachi Vargas worked like only as trumpeter. His form to interpret created a unique and pioneer style that is the most imitated model until the actuality. In the Mariachi México de Pepe Villa, Martinez invented the dueto de trompetas (duet of trumpets), used in the majority of mariachi groups. Martinez reduced his professional activity from the 1970s after a dental problem derived from the trumpet use. From the 1990s decade Martinez increased his participations and talks in the United States where he attended several Mariachi festivals and congresses giving talks and workshops.

Work

Books 
 Mi vida, mis viajes, mis vivencias: siete décadas en la música del mariachi (2012, Conaculta)

See also 
 Mariachi Vargas of Tecalitlán

References 

Mariachi musicians
Musicians from Guanajuato
1921 births
2014 deaths